William Schenker (born 14 February 1958) is an alpine skier and auto racer. He competed in the men's slalom at the 1998 Winter Olympics, representing Puerto Rico.

References

External links
 

1958 births
Living people
People from San Juan, Puerto Rico
Puerto Rican male alpine skiers
Olympic alpine skiers of Puerto Rico
Alpine skiers at the 1998 Winter Olympics
People from Brooklyn